The Anopheles latens mosquito (part of the An. leucosphyrus group) is an important vector for the transmission of malaria in humans and monkeys in Southeast Asia.  It is an important vector for the transmission of human malaria in Sarawak; but because it is attracted to both humans and to macaques it is also responsible for the transmission of simian malarias to humans (Plasmodium knowlesi and possibly P. inui as well).

A. latens tends to bite from 6 p.m. throughout the night, peaking at midnight.  It is found in forests and at forest fringes, but tends not to enter human dwellings.

References

Insects described in 2005
latens